Sun Prairie is the name of various things in the United States:

Sun Prairie, Montana, a census-designated place
Sun Prairie, Wisconsin, a city
Sun Prairie High School
Sun Prairie (town), Wisconsin